Lukas Kwasniok (born 12 June 1981) is a Polish former footballer and manager of SC Paderborn.

Career
On 4 December 2016, Kwasniok was announced as the interim replacement for Tomas Oral at Karlsruher SC, as the club were struggling in the 2. Bundesliga, and replaced on 22 December 2016.

On 9 December 2018, he was named head coach of Carl Zeiss Jena. He was sacked on 28 September 2019.

In December 2019 he was announced as the new manager of 1. FC Saarbrücken starting on 1 January 2020. He announced that he would leave after the 2020–21 season.

On 17 May 2021, 2. Bundesliga club SC Paderborn announced Kwasniok as head coach, succeeding Steffen Baumgart until 2023.

Coaching record

References

External links

Lukas Kwasniok at kicker.de

1981 births
Living people
Sportspeople from Gliwice
Polish footballers
Polish football managers
German footballers
German football managers
Association football midfielders
Arminia Bielefeld players
SV Sandhausen players
2. Bundesliga managers
3. Liga managers
Karlsruher SC managers
FC Carl Zeiss Jena managers
1. FC Saarbrücken managers
SC Paderborn 07 managers